Asseco Resovia Rzeszów 2017–2018 season is the 2017/2018 volleyball season for Polish professional volleyball club Asseco Resovia Rzeszów.

The club competes in:
 Polish Championship
 Polish Cup
 CEV Cup

On December 3, 2017 Asseco Resovia announced the information about terminating the contract with head coach Roberto Serniotti. The unofficial reason was the low results after 12 rounds of league. His duties were taken over by a former head coach Andrzej Kowal.

Team roster

Squad changes for the 2017–2018 season
In:

Out:

References

Resovia (volleyball) seasons